Patrick de Carolis (born 19 November 1953) is a French TV journalist and writer. He has been president of French public service broadcaster France Télévisions from July 2005 to August 2010.

Biography

Journalistic career

President of France Télévisions
Upon termination of Marc Tessier's presidency on 22 August 2005, De Carolis was appointed president of France Télévisions. During his tenure, the 2008 reform that cut advertisements from 8pm through 6am everyday and made the French President the direct appointer of the president of France Télévisions was adopted. He also oversaw the transformation of the state broadcaster into a multi-brand consolidated company: what have previously been subsidiary companies with distinctive brands and operating revenues became integrated parts of France Télévisions. He held the position until 23 August 2010.

Mayor of Arles
On 28 June 2020, he was elected mayor of Arles, his native town, as an independent candidate.

Published works

 Conversation, with Bernadette Chirac, Ed. Omnibus, 2001, 
 Les demoiselles de Provence, Ed. Plon, 2005, 
 Refuge pour temps d’orage, Ed. Plon, 2009,

See also
 France Télévisions
 France 3
 TF1
 M6
 Zone Interdite

References

External links
  Biography on ESJ Paris's site

People from Arles
1953 births
Living people
20th-century French journalists
21st-century French journalists
French male writers
French television presenters
French television journalists
French television executives
Officiers of the Légion d'honneur
Officiers of the Ordre des Arts et des Lettres
Knights of the Ordre national du Mérite
Knights Commander of the Order of St Gregory the Great
Mayors of places in Provence-Alpes-Côte d'Azur